Kaisi Yeh Paheli is a 2017 Pakistani drama television series aired on Urdu 1, produced by Kashif Mirza under production banner A&F Production. The serial stars Azfar Rehman and Sohai Ali Abro in lead role.

Kaisi Yeh Paheli marks comeback of Abro on small screen. The principal shooting of the serial took place at Karachi, however certain scenes were shooted in Malaysia and Murree too.

Cast
Azfar Rehman as Sameer
Sohai Ali Abro as Miraal aka Meeru
Saleem Sheikh as Javed
Sana Askari as Nazish
Ayesha Khan as Almaas
Samina Ahmed as Aani
Qazi Wajid as Jahangir
Shaheen Khan as Aamna
Hajra Khan as Madiha
Hammad Abbas as Farhan
Hanif Muhammad as Nasir
Hassam Khan as Sheeraz
Farah Nadeem as Sadia
Azmat Ansari as Nisho
Saba Shah as Sania
Aiman Zaman as Eesha
Jinaan Hussain as Millie (cameo)

References

2017 Pakistani television series debuts
2017 Pakistani television series endings